The Philippine women's national rugby sevens team, known as the Volcanoes, represents the Philippines in rugby sevens. They played their first international sevens in 2010 at the Asian Championships. They won the 2019 Asia Rugby Women's 7s Trophy Series in Indonesia.

Players

Previous Squads 

Monica Bolofer
Tammy Fletcher
Gelaine Gamba
Hilla Indigne 
Camilla Maslo
Ada Milby
Trixie Pacis (cc)
Rara Sales
Acee San Juan (cc)
Sylvia Tudoc
Cassie Umali
Dixie Yu

BRONZE MEDALISTS
Rose dela Cruz 
Gelaine Gamba
Kaye Honoras
Hilla Indigne (vc)
Ada Milby
Aiumi Ono
Trixie Pacis
Rara Sales
Madille Salinas
Acee San Juan (c)
Sylvia Tudoc
Dixie Yu

Rose dela Cruz 
Gelaine Gamba
Kaye Honoras
Hilla Indigne (vc)
Luisa Jordan
Leilani Martin
Michelle Mateo
Rara Sales
Madille Salinas
Acee San Juan (c)
Sylvia Tudoc
Dixie Yu

Rose dela Cruz
Tammy Fletcher 
Kaye Honoras
Hilla Indigne
Eunice Lacaste
Gelaine Gamba
Rara Sales
Madille Salinas
Acee San Juan (c)
Aiumi Ono
Cassie Umali (vc)
Isabel Silva

Rose dela Cruz
Tammy Fletcher (c)
Kaye Honoras
Hilla Indigne
Luisa Jordan
Michelle Marki
Rara Sales
Madille Salinas
Acee San Juan
Sylvia Tudoc
Cassie Umali (vc)
Dixie Yu

Amelia Breyre
Tonette Gambito
Kaye Honoras
Luisa Jordan
Nikki Lira
Michelle Marki
Ada Milby (c)
Jen Saldo
Acee San Juan
Manila Santos
Sylvia Tudoc
Cassie Umali (vc)

Charmaine Bolando
Tonette Gambito
Kaye Honoras
Luisa Jordan
Nikki Lira
Ada Milby (c)
Astrid Sadaya
Jen Saldo
Madille Salinas
Acee San Juan
Sylvia Tudoc
Cassie Umali (vc)

Julie Ann Else
Mirasol Leiloha Linsteadt
Nikki Lira
Leilani Martin
Ada Milby (c)
Rozie Morala
Aiumi Ono (vc)
Trixie Pacis
Madille Salinas
Acee San Juan
Rhea Manila Santos
Syndee Storey
Cassie Umali

Dyesebel Diaz
Jackie Finlan (cc)
Nikki Lira
Aiumi Ono
Cassie Umali 
Trixie Pacis
Alana Padilla 
Rosette Rough (cc)
Arlene Trinkler
Isabela Silva

 

Dyesebel Diaz
Jackie Finlan (cc)
Nikki Lira
Aumi Ono
Marga Pacis
Trixie Pacis
Alana Padilla
Rosette Rough (cc)
Blessie de los Santos
Manila Santos
Isabela Silva
Syndee Storey

Coaches
 Susan Konstanty (2013-2015)
 Matt Cullen (2010-2012)
 Fetala'a Taua'a (2021–)

Captains 
Tammy Fletcher (2014)
Ada Milby (2012-2013)
Rosette Rough and Jackie Finlan (2010-2011)

References

External links
 Philippine Rugby Union Official Site 

Rugby union in the Philippines
Women's national rugby sevens teams
W